The String Quartet in C minor WAB 111, was composed by Anton Bruckner's in 1862 during his tuition by Otto Kitzler.

History 
In the spring of 1862, during his tuition by Otto Kitzler, Bruckner composed two scherzi for string quartet in F major and G minor. Thereafter, between 28 July and 7 August 1862, he composed the String Quartet in C minor, as a preliminary to exercises in orchestration. The manuscript of the Quartet was found on pp. 165–196 of the Kitzler-Studienbuch.

On reviewing Bruckner's work one week later (15 August 1862), Kitzler was perhaps dissatisfied with Bruckner's unconventionality of the first rondo. He therefore suggested that a Rondo   and in a more traditional rondo-sonata form would have benefited the piece. The 40-bars longer piece, which has the same key, metre and formal structure as the first Rondo, can, therefore, be regarded as an alternative to the first Rondo.  The Quartet was not issued during Bruckner's life, since it concerned a sample of capability during his study period at Kitzler. Bruckner did not bequeath a score of it as he did for the later Four Orchestral Pieces. The Kitzler-Studienbuch was wound up in the legacy of Bruckner's friend Josef Schalk in Munich, in which the Quartet was discovered in 1950 by the Koeckert Quartet. The Koeckert Quartet premiered the Quartet on 15 February 1951 in a broadcast of the Rundfunk im amerikanischen Sektor, and performed it on 8 March 1951 in a concert in Hamburg. There are recordings of the 1951 premiere in the broadcasting archives of the RIAS, its successor the Rundfunk Berlin-Brandenburg, and the Bavarian and Norddeutsche Rundfunk. A recording from the archive of the NDR is available in the Bruckner Archive.

Edition 

Setting 

The piece is a conventional string quartet in the usual four movements:
 Allegro moderato, C minor, common time
 Andante, A-flat major, 3/4, with Minore section in A-flat minor
 Scherzo, Presto G major, 3/4, Trio
 Rondo, Schnell, C minor, 2/4
Duration: 19 to 24 minutes.

Unlike his later works, Bruckner gave few indications as to phrasing, while dynamics appear only at a few key points. Rudolf Koeckert allowed Leopold Nowak to put his group's phrasing and dynamics into the Gesamtausgabe parts. However, the Gesamtausgabe score contains only those markings in Bruckner's hand. The String Quartet is a settlement with classical and early romantic examples. The from the beginning polyphonic imprint refers back to Bruckner's earlier exercises.

The first movement, in traditional sonata form, is with audacious modulations in the development. The exposition is marked for repeat; the only other Bruckner work with such a repeat is the Symphony in F minor.
The Andante, in three parts (ABA) with modified reprise, mirrors Beethoven's choice of key for a slow movement after a C minor Allegro, but having the central section in the parallel minor is something Bruckner never does again.
The Trio of the Scherzo is in Ländler form. Derek Watson finds that the Trio "has a Schubertian, freshly bucolic charm."
The Rondo has virtuoso accents. The B theme appears first in E-flat major and later in C major, and the last turn of the A theme is highly ornamented. This rondo has a curious feature, in that in Part 6, the B theme from Part 2 and the C theme from Part 4 are present together.

One can already see connections to later Bruckner works in the key (C minor), in several harmonic phrases and theme patterns, as well as the use of Ländler motives.

Selected discography 

There are about 10 recordings of the String Quartet. 

The first recording was by the Keller Quartett: LP Da Camera magna SM 92707/8, 1962.

Excellent recordings are according to Hans Roelofs i.a. those by the Koeckert Quartett (1974), L'Archibudelli, the Fine Arts Quartet and the Zehetmair Streichquartett. Where the Koeckert Quartet actually disregarded the few dynamics markings Bruckner gave, the Fine Arts Quartet obeys Bruckner's markings but mostly ignores Koeckert's.
 Koeckert Quartett. Studio recording of 1974 put on compiling CD: Karna Musik Live KA-143M
 L'Archibudelli. Anton Bruckner: String Quintet. Intermezzo. Rondo. String Quartet. CD: Sony Classical Vivarte SK 66 251, 1995 - on historical instruments
 Fine Arts Quartet. BRUCKNER: String Quintet in F Major / String Quartet in C Minor. CD: Naxos 8.570788, 2008
 Zehetmair Streichquartett. Beethoven, Bruckner, Hartmann, Holliger. CD: ECM 2195/96, 2010
 Fitzwilliam Quartet. Anton Bruckner: String Quintet / String Quartet. CD: Linn LC 11615, 2011 - on historical instruments

References

Sources 
 Anton Bruckner: Sämtliche Werke: Band XIII/1: Streichquartett c-Moll Musikwissenschaftlicher Verlag der Internationalen Bruckner-Gesellschaft, Leopold Nowak (Editor), Vienna, 1955
 Uwe Harten, Anton Bruckner. Ein Handbuch, Salzburg, 1996, 
 Derek Watson, "Bruckner", Schirmer, New York, 1996
 Benjamin Korstvedt, "Aspects of Bruckner's approach to symphonic form", The Cambridge Companion to Bruckner edited by John Williamson, Cambridge University Press, Cambridge, 2004
 Cornelis van Zwol, Anton Bruckner – Leven en Werken, Thot, Bussum (Netherlands), 2012. 
 William Carragan. Anton Bruckner - Eleven Symphonies. Bruckner Society of America, Windsor CT, 2020, .

External links 
 Streichquartett c-Moll, WAB 111 Critical discography by Hans Roelofs   
 
 Bruckner's Critical Complete Edition - Chamber Music
 Bruckner's Critical Complete Edition - Early Orchestral and Instrumental Works
 The following live performances can be heard on YouTube:
 the Filarmonica-quartet (Novosibirsk, 2013): Bruckner's String Quartet
 the Notre Quartet (Seoul, 2015): 1. Allegro moderato, 2. Andante, 3. Scherzo & 4. Rondo

Chamber music by Anton Bruckner
Bruckner
1862 compositions
Compositions in C minor
Bruckner

de:Kammermusik (Bruckner)#Frühe Kammermusik